Golden Time may refer to:

Golden Time (novel series), a Japanese light novel series
Golden Time (TV series), a South Korean drama
The Golden Time, a Canadian novel
Golden Time, the 19:00–22:00 timeslot in Japanese television; see prime time
Golden hour (medicine), also known as golden time, the time period following a traumatic injury where treatment has the highest chance of preventing death

See also
 Golden Age (disambiguation)